San José Fútbol Club is a Costa Rican soccer team that plays in the Second Division of Costa Rica, the second national category.

History 

It was founded in 2021 in the San José canton after some local businessmen acquired the Juventud Escazuceña franchise, which ran into financial problems due to the Covid-19 pandemic at the end of the 2020/21 season.

Despite representing the San José canton, the club will play its inaugural season at the Nicolás Masís Stadium in the Escazú canton.

Stadium
The Nicolás Masís Quesada Stadium is a sports venue located in the city of Escazú in the province of San José, Costa Rica.

It is the local headquarters of the DIMAS de Escazú team of the first division of women's soccer and of San José FC, which plays in the Second Division of Costa Rica.

Current squad
As of January 20, 2023

References 

San José, Costa Rica
Football in Costa Rica